The Cameroon national handball team is the national handball team of Cameroon.

Tournament record

African Nations Championship

IHF Emerging Nations Championship
2015 – 7th place

External links
IHF profile

Men's national handball teams
National sports teams of Cameroon